The Ministry of ICT and National Guidance (formerly the Ministry of Information and Communications Technology) is a cabinet ministry of Uganda. The ministry is headed by Chris Baryomunsi.

Location
The headquarters of the ministry are located at ICT House, 10-12 Parliament Avenue, in Kampala Central Division, in the capital city of Kampala. The coordinates of the headquarters of the ministry are 00°18'49.0"N, 32°35'13.0"E (Latitude:0.313622; Longitude:32.586938).

Overview
The ICT ministry was created in 2006. The ministry is mandated to provide leadership, coordination, support and advocacy in the formulation of policy, laws, regulations and strategy for the ICT sector in Uganda, to foster the achievement of national development goals. Ruth Nankabirwa, the current ICT cabinet minister has set the goal, in the medium term, for Uganda to join the six leading African countries in the ICT arena.

List of ministers

Minister of ICT and National Guidance
 Chris Baryomunsi (8 June 2021 - present)

Minister of Information and Communications Technology
 Judith Nabakooba (14 December 2019 - 6 June 2021)
 Frank Tumwebaze (6 June 2016 - 14 December 2019)

Minister for Information and National Guidance
 Jim Muhwezi (1 March 2015 - 6 June 2016)
 Rose Namayanja (23 May 2013 - 1 March 2015)
 Mary Karooro Okurut (27 May 2011 - 23 May 2013)
 Kabakumba Masiko (16 February 2009 - 27 May 2011)

Auxiliary institutions and allied agencies
 National Information Technology Authority - Uganda (NITAU)
 Uganda Communications Commission
 Uganda Broadcasting Corporation
 Posta Uganda
 Uganda Institute of Information & Communications Technology (UICT)

See also
Government of Uganda
Cabinet of Uganda
List of mobile network operators in Uganda

References

External links
 Ministry of Information & Communications Technology
 Uganda ICT Sector Profile

ICT
Information technology in Uganda
Communications in Uganda
Uganda
2006 establishments in Uganda